Knight's Hill ward is an administrative division of the London Borough of Lambeth, United Kingdom, roughly covering the West Norwood area.

The boundaries of Knights Hill are the A214 in the south and the A215 to the east.

The population of Knights Hill is 13,687 according to the 2001 census, this is an increase of around 2000. This is 5.1% of the Lambeth borough population. The population is predominantly over 65. The area of the ward is 146.8 hectares. At the 2011 Census the population of the ward had increased to 14,763.

According to Lambeth Council, Knight's Hill has high numbers of people with long-term illnesses, as well as the highest number of people over the age of 65. Many pensioners in the area have low amenities.

West Norwood railway station is situated in the ward as are Norwood Girls School and St Luke's school.

Knight's Hill ward is located in the Dulwich and West Norwood Parliamentary constituency.

Lambeth Council elections 2010 & 14
At the Lambeth Council elections, 2010 residents of Knight's Hill ward elected three Labour Party Councillors. This was repeated in 2014.

Lambeth Council elections 2018 
The 2018 Lambeth council elections take place on Thursday May 3, 2018 with three councillors to be elected.

References

External links
Lambeth Borough Council profile for the ward
Knight's Hill ward election results on Lambeth website
West Norwood news (Knight's Hill Labour Party)

Wards of the London Borough of Lambeth